Raven is an unincorporated community in Brown County, Nebraska, United States.

History
A post office was established at Raven in 1906, and remained in operation until it was discontinued in 1922.

References

Unincorporated communities in Brown County, Nebraska
Unincorporated communities in Nebraska